Vaudreuil-sur-le-Lac (literally Vaudreuil on the Lake) is a village municipality in Vaudreuil-Soulanges Regional County Municipality in the Montérégie region of Quebec, Canada. It is located on the western portion of the Vaudreuil Peninsula, which projects into Lake of Two Mountains. The population as of the Canada 2016 Census was 1,341.

Vaudreuil-sur-le-Lac is predominantly residential (90%), and only 10% industrial and commercial. The Club Nautique des Deux-Montagnes attracts many sailing enthusiasts.

History
Early in the twentieth century, the first vacationers arrived here, attracted to the beauty of the lakeshore. May 19, 1920, marked the date of the incorporation of the village Municipality of Belle-Plage (meaning "beautiful beach"), with Ludger Dupont as first mayor. Belle-Plage was then primarily known as a vacation destination: there were 77 owners for a total of about 300 people but only seven families residing here permanently.

On January 4, 1960, the Municipal Council changed the name of "Belle-Plage" to "Vaudreuil-sur-le-Lac". The new village name is a reference to the historic Vaudreuil Seignory, granted to and named after Philippe de Rigaud Vaudreuil, Governor of New France from 1703 to 1725.

In the early 1960s, the region began to be transformed into a residential suburb of Montreal City following the construction of the Île aux Tourtes Bridge and Highway 40, which passes Vaudreuil-sur-le-Lac just to the south. Consequently, in the late sixties the village began to witness a perceptible increase in population.

Demographics 

Local government

The “city council” consists of the “mayor” and six councilors. “Municipal elections” are held every four years as a block, without a “territorial division” [1]. Mayor Claude Pilon resigned on January 6, 2020 after 31 years of service. Mr. André Bélanger acted as deputy mayor from January 7 until December 18. Mr. Philip Lapalme won the by-election and took office as the new mayor on December 18, 2020 to November 7, 2021 after being defeated by Mario Tremblay at the general election on November 7, 2021. The director general and secretary-treasurer is Mario B. Briggs.

Former mayors
List of former mayors:
 Charles George Hector Dupont (1920–1929)
 Joseph Telesphore Lalonde (1920–1931)
 Joseph Antoine Dona Guinard (1931–1953)
 Joseph Marie Marcel Simard (1953–1955)
 Olivier Picard (1955–1960)
 Joseph Eugène Raoul Roland Sauvage (1960–1966)
 Joseph Jean Jacques Sauvage (1966–1975)
 Joseph Roland Antoine Roger Besner (1975–1987)
 Luc Tison (1987–1998)
 Claude Pilon (1998–2020)
 André Bélanger (interim 2020)
 Philip Lapalme (2020–2021)
 Mario Tremblay (2021–present)

Education
Commission Scolaire des Trois-Lacs operates Francophone schools. It is zoned to École Saint-Michel and École Sainte-Madeleine in Vaudreuil-Dorion.

Lester B. Pearson School Board operates Anglophone schools. It is zoned to Mount Pleasant Elementary School in Hudson.

See also
 List of village municipalities in Quebec

References

External links

 Official website

Incorporated places in Vaudreuil-Soulanges Regional County Municipality
Villages in Quebec
Greater Montreal